Fay Surtees Marles  (née Pearce; born 3 January 1926) is a former Australian public servant. She served as Victorian Commissioner of Equal Opportunity from 1977 to 1987 and Chancellor of the University of Melbourne from 2001 to 2004.

Early life
Marles was born in Melbourne and educated at Ruyton Girls' School in Kew. She graduated from the University of Melbourne in 1948 with a Bachelor of Arts and Diploma of Social Work. She subsequently became a social worker in Queensland. However, after her marriage to Donald Marles in 1952 she was subjected to the marriage bar and forced to resign her position. She and her husband had four children, including politician Richard Marles.

Professional career
Marles completed a Master of Arts in 1975 and was appointed a senior tutor in social work at the University of Melbourne. In 1977, she was chosen as Victoria's inaugural Commissioner of Equal Opportunity, holding the position for ten years. She subsequently formed a consulting firm. In 2001, Marles was appointed to replace Sir Edward Woodward as Chancellor of the University of Melbourne, as the first woman to hold the position. She served until 2004.

References

External links

1926 births
Living people
Members of the Order of Australia
Australian social workers
University of Melbourne alumni
Chancellors of the University of Melbourne
People educated at Ruyton Girls' School
Public servants of Victoria (Australia)